The Church of the Virgin of Mount Carmel and St. Thérèse of Lisieux, also known as Iglesia de los Carmelitas, is a Roman Catholic parish church in the neighbourhood of Prado, Montevideo, Uruguay.

The church was built in Neo-Gothic style by architects Guillermo Armas and Albérico Isola, between 1929 and 1954. It was held by the Carmelites until 1995, then it was leased to the Archdiocese. The church is dedicated to Our Lady of Mount Carmel and Saint Thérèse of Lisieux.

The parish was established on 8 September 1962.

References

External links

1962 establishments in Uruguay
Roman Catholic churches completed in 1954
Roman Catholic church buildings in Montevideo
Gothic Revival church buildings in Uruguay
Our Lady of Mount Carmel
Prado, Montevideo
20th-century Roman Catholic church buildings in Uruguay